Union County Performing Arts Center (UCPAC), formerly the Rahway Theatre, is a non-profit performance venue in Rahway, New Jersey, a small city west of Staten Island  that was recently named "#2 Best Small Town Arts Scene" in the country by USA Today. As of the early 2020s, downtown Rahway has become a regional hub in the performing and visual arts. It was added to the National Register of Historic Places in 1986.  UCPAC is the site of the annual Rahway International Film Festival.

History
It was founded as the vaudeville venue and silent movie house Rahway Theater in 1928 as the nation's first “million dollar” movie palace.  It contains an original, working, fully restored Wurlitzer pipe organ which was placed on the American Theatre Organ Society's National Registry of Significant Instruments. It is an example of "Movie Palace" architecture, designed in the classical revival style by New York architect David M. Oltarsh.

In 2006, at the behest of Rahway's then-mayor James J. Kennedy, the Union County Board of Chosen Freeholders invested $6.2 million in the renovation of the UCPAC Mainstage (Rahway Theater). The building fell into dilapidation as a movie house in the 1970s. It was reopened by local nonprofit preservation group in 1984, and was listed on the National Register of Historic Places in 1986.

Facilities
The UCPAC campus includes four performance spaces:

Mainstage
 
Capacity: 1334

Hamilton Stage

Built in 2012 abutting the Rahway River several hundred feet to the west of Mainstage, the Hamilton Stage features a new fully equipped proscenium theater.

Capacity: 199

The Loft at Mainstage
Capacity: 65.  Built in 2008, the Loft at UCPAC is located on the 2nd floor addition of the UCPAC Mainstage.

The Fazioli Room at Hamilton Stage
This 40’ x 60’ rehearsal space has floor-to-ceiling conservatory windows and wall-length mirrors on one side.  It holds 55–75 (at maximum).

This room contains a Fazioli piano, one of only two in New Jersey.

The Café at UCPAC
Hosts the Jazz Club at UCPAC.

Programming
Well-known music and comedy acts have included Johnny Cash, Martina McBride, Willie Nelson, B.B. King, Joan Jett, Joan Rivers, Louie Anderson, Sinbad, Cedric the Entertainer, Pat Benatar, Kenny Rogers, Lance Bass, Eddie Money, En Vogue, Starship, Otown, Aaron Carter, Ryan Cabrera, Bowling for Soup, Vanessa Williams, Doug E. Fresh, Mark McGrath and Slick Rick.

Rahway Arts District 
The UCPAC area hosts many art galleries, converted industrial warehouse spaces, and rehearsal/studio space. In 2020, downtown Rahway received accolades as a Great Downtown by the APA: "Downtown Rahway is a great place. It is a place that emphasizes livability, walkability, shopping, food, art, diversity and a destination. Centered in the heart of the bustling City of Rahway, next to the NJ Transit Station, Rahway's downtown is the building block for this diverse city."

The Willows Residence for the Arts
The city of Rahway and UCPAC in association with the Actors Fund has built safe affordable housing for artists only. Tenant applicants need to submit a portfolio of work to indicate their vocation and be assigned to a waitlist.

Transportation 
UCPAC is walking distance to the direct train at Rahway Station to New York Penn Station.  The ride is 38 minutes.

References

Rahway, New Jersey
Tourist attractions in Union County, New Jersey
Theatres in New Jersey
Concert halls in New Jersey
Event venues established in 1928
Buildings and structures in Union County, New Jersey
Performing arts centers in New Jersey
National Register of Historic Places in Union County, New Jersey
Public venues with a theatre organ